This is a list of named minor planets in numerical order. , it contains a total of 23,542 named bodies. Minor planets for which no article exists redirect to the list of minor planets (see ).

Statistics

See also 
 List of minor planet discoverers
 List of minor planets named after animals and plants
 List of minor planets named after people
 List of minor planets named after places
 List of minor planets named after rivers
 List of observatory codes

References

External links 
 Discovery Circumstances: Numbered Minor Planets, Minor Planet Center

Lists of minor planets by name
Minor planets numerical